Annette Kingsland Ziegler (born March 6, 1964) is an American attorney and jurist serving as Chief Justice of the Wisconsin Supreme Court since May 2021. She has been a member of the Court since 2007, and is generally regarded as part of its conservative wing. Ziegler served as a Wisconsin circuit court judge in Washington County from 1997 to 2007.

Early life and education 
Ziegler was born in Grand Rapids, Michigan, to Joyce and Rex R. Kingsland, and graduated from Grand Rapids's Forest Hills Central High School in 1982. She received a bachelor's degree in business administration and psychology from Hope College in 1986, and a Juris Doctor from Marquette University Law School in 1989. While in law school she was a staff editor of the Marquette Law Review, as well as a recipient of the Dean's Award.

Early career
After graduating from law school, Ziegler was admitted to the State Bar of Wisconsin in 1989.  Before serving in the judiciary, she worked as a federal prosecutor, an Assistant U.S. Attorney for the Eastern District of Wisconsin. She was also a pro bono Special Assistant District Attorney in the Milwaukee County District Attorney's Office. In private practice, she was a civil private practice attorney for several years at the law firm of O'Neil, Cannon, Hollman & DeJong, SC.

Wisconsin Circuit Court
In 1997, Governor Tommy Thompson appointed Ziegler to the Washington County Circuit Court, in the Branch 2 vacancy created by the death of Judge James B. Schwalbach. She was elected to a full term in April 1998 and reelected in 2004, both times unopposed. She then ran the Supreme Court seat being vacated by retiring Justice Jon P. Wilcox.

Wisconsin Supreme Court

Ziegler faced Madison attorney Linda Clifford in the April 2007 general election, after they were the top two finishers in the February primary.  The campaign was contentious. Ziegler asserted that Clifford's lack of judicial experience made her ill-prepared for the Supreme Court; she also raised concerns about two of Clifford's campaign workers misrepresenting themselves to law enforcement officials.  Clifford asserted that Ziegler had ruled in cases where she had a clear conflict of interest.

It came to light during the campaign that Ziegler had ruled on roughly a dozen cases affecting a bank of which her husband was a paid board member, and on 22 cases involving companies in which Ziegler personally owned more than $50,000 of stock.

On April 3, 2007, Ziegler defeated Clifford in the election, 58% to 42%. Her campaign and allies outspent Clifford $4.1 million to $1.7 million. The influential business lobbying associations Wisconsin Manufacturers & Commerce and Wisconsin Club for Growth spent $2.6 million in support of Ziegler.

Following her election, the Wisconsin Supreme Court, in a 5 to 1 decision, took the unprecedented step of publicly reprimanding Ziegler for willful violations of the code of judicial conduct by presiding over those cases where she had an apparent conflict of interest.

In 2015, Ziegler joined the 4-person majority that ended the John Doe investigation into possibly illegal coordination between the 2010 gubernatorial campaign of Scott Walker and Wisconsin Manufacturers & Commerce and Wisconsin Club for Growth. The court ruled that such coordination, if it had occurred, would be legal. The sweeping ruling upended Wisconsin campaign finance rules, enabling close coordination between campaigns and political action committees, which do not have to disclose their donors.

In 2017, she joined a 5 to 2 decision to strike down a rule that would have required judges to recuse from cases where they had received lawful campaign contributions from one of the interested parties.

Ziegler was reelected in 2017 without opposition. Her term expires on July 31, 2027.

In 2021, Chief Justice Patience Roggensack, then 80 years old, declined to seek another two-year term as chief justice. On April 14, 2021, Ziegler's colleagues elected her as the next Chief Justice of the Wisconsin Supreme Court, effective May 1, 2021. Ziegler is the second chief justice to be elected by her colleagues since the constitution was amended to establish this selection process.

Electoral history

Wisconsin Circuit Court (1998, 2004)

Wisconsin Supreme Court (2007, 2017)

| colspan="6" style="text-align:center;background-color: #e9e9e9;"| Primary Election, February 20, 2007

| colspan="6" style="text-align:center;background-color: #e9e9e9;"| General Election, April 3, 2007

| colspan="6" style="text-align:center;background-color: #e9e9e9;"| General Election, April 4, 2017

References

External links

"Ziegler Faces Conflict Questions", Milwaukee Journal-Sentinel, March 5, 2007
"Judge Takes More Than Half of Votes", Milwaukee Journal-Sentinel, February 20, 2007

|-

1964 births
21st-century American judges
21st-century American women judges
Chief Justices of the Wisconsin Supreme Court
Hope College alumni
Justices of the Wisconsin Supreme Court
Living people
Marquette University alumni
Politicians from Grand Rapids, Michigan
Wisconsin state court judges
Women chief justices of state supreme courts in the United States